Burnhope Seat is a high moorland fell in the North Pennines Area of Outstanding Natural Beauty (AONB) in northern England. It lies between the heads of the Rivers Tees, South Tyne and Wear. The summit is crossed by the boundary between County Durham and Cumbria (historically Cumberland). The trig point is the highest point in historic County Durham. However, this is not quite the summit of the mountain (which lies 400 m west and 1 m higher across the border into historic Cumberland). Mickle Fell, south of Teesdale is higher than Burnhope Seat and is sometimes quoted as being the highest top of County Durham, but this is historically not correct. Mickle Fell, although it lies within the unitary council area of Durham County Council for administrative purposes, is historically a part of the North Riding of Yorkshire, and is the highest point in that county.

The character of the fell is very typical of the high Pennines, with an extensive and poorly drained summit plateau of tussock grass and peat bog. The B6277 road between Alston and Middleton-in-Teesdale passes within 2 km of the summit, thus providing the easiest route of ascent. The hill may also be climbed from Weardale as part of high-level circuit of Burnhope Reservoir. There are some ski-tows on the northwest slopes of the hill - this forms the Yad Moss ski facility, which has recently been upgraded by Sport England.

The entire area is designated "access land" under the terms of the Countryside and Rights of Way Act 2000.

Marilyns of England
Hewitts of England
Mountains and hills of the Pennines
Mountains and hills of Cumbria
Mountains and hills of County Durham
Nuttalls
Highest points of English counties
Ski areas and resorts in England
Eden District
Stanhope, County Durham